Jacana may refer to:

Life forms 
 Jacanidae (or jacanas), a tropical bird family
 Jacana (genus), endemic to the Americas
 Jácana tree (Pouteria multiflora), endemic to the Americas

Places

Australia 
 Jacana, Victoria, a suburb of Melbourne

Brazil 
 Jaçanã (district of São Paulo), a suburb
 Jaçanã, Rio Grande do Norte, a municipality

Puerto Rico 
 Jácana, Yauco, Puerto Rico, a barrio in Yauco, a western municipality
 Jácanas, a barrio in Yabucoa, an eastern municipality

Ships 
 USS Jacana (AMS-193), an American  minesweeper, 1954–1976